Prope Ltd. (株式会社プロペ, Kabushiki-gaisha Purope)  was a Japanese video game development studio founded by Sonic Team head Yuji Naka, along with 10 other former Sonic Team staff. 

The company name means "near" in Latin.

Formation
As part of Sega's "support program for independent game creators", Yuji Naka left Sega's Sonic Team studio to start his own studio, joined by ten Sonic Team members. It had a starting capital of 10 million yen, 10% of which came from Sega in exchange for the right of first refusal for publishing Prope games. Prope was founded on May 23, 2006 and began operations on June 1.

Prope intended to create games with a graphical style that appealed to both children and adults, and to explore the possibilities of developing both 3D and 2D games. Naka joined Square Enix in January 2018, leaving the status of Prope uncertain. In March 2019, Naka confirmed that Prope had been reduced to a one-person company since the end of April 2017. 

Naka released SHOT2048 under the Prope brand in December 2021, his first game following his departure from Square Enix back in April. 

Due to Naka's multiple arrests for insider trading in late 2022, the company now has no active employees or management and is therefore technically defunct.

Games
Previously, the studio had been consistently linked with a sequel to Nights into Dreams..., though Nights: Journey of Dreams was ultimately developed by Sega Studio USA. Naka has claimed in an interview that he presently has no intention to revisit any of his former Sega properties.

Prope's first two titles, the Wii rhythm game Let's Tap, and the WiiWare game Let's Catch, were both released in December 2008. Both games were published by Sega.

After a series of simplistic iOS games such as 10 Count Boxer and Fluffy Bear, under the iPrope label, Prope's next major game Ivy the Kiwi? was released in November 2009 exclusively for Windows Phone, with Microsoft publishing it. In April 2009, it was ported to WiiWare and DSiWare and published by Bandai Namco in Japan, Xseed Games in America and Rising Star Games in Europe as Prope's parent company Sega refused to publish the game and Bandai Namco decided not to publish the game outside Asia. In 2010, an expanded physical release (in contrast to a digital one) was released for Wii  and Nintendo DS, featuring 50 levels (whereas the downloadable version featured 25) as well as original backgrounds and music for each level.

In 2011, Prope released Real Ski Jump, which, as of 2014, had been downloaded 4 million times.

iOS/Android
Published under the iPrope and aPrope label respectively
 Let's Tap (2009)
 10 Count Boxer (2009)
 Fluffy Bear (2009)
 Just Half (2010)
 PD -prope discoverer- (2011) 
 Real Ski Jump HD
 Get the Time (2011)
 Past Camera (2011) (photography app - not a video game)
 Power of Coin (2011)
 Nine Dungeon (2011)
 Real Animals HD (2011)
 Flick Pig (2011)
 Real SkiJump Battle (2012)
 Ivy the Kiwi? (2012)
 Buddy Monster (2012)
 Real Whales (2013)
 E-Anbai Just Right (2014)
 Samurai Santaro (2014)
 Kodama (2015)
 Real Whales (2015)
 Shock Maze VR (2015)
 Crazy Open Car (2016)
 God & the Bell Kitty (2016)
 10 Battle (2016)
 Pirates of Coin (2016)
 Kizumon (2017)
 Shot2048 (2021)

Nintendo DS
 Ivy the Kiwi? (2010)

Nintendo 3DS
 StreetPass Mansion (2013)
 StreetPass Fishing (2015)
 Streetpass Chef (2016)

PlayStation 3
 Digimon All-Star Rumble (2014)

PlayStation Portable
 Digimon Adventure (2013)

Wii
 Let's Catch (2008)
 Let's Tap (2008)
 Ivy the Kiwi? (2010)
 Fishing Resort (2011)
 Rodea the Sky Soldier (2015)

Windows Mobile
 Ivy the Kiwi? (2009)

Xbox 360
 Digimon All-Star Rumble (2014)

References

External links
Prope Official WebSite (Japanese)
SEGA x PROPE
iPrope Official Website (English)
IGN: Prope

Video game companies of Japan
Video game development companies
Video game companies established in 2006
Japanese companies established in 2006